Lynn Brian Zimmerman (born July 13, 1942) is a Canadian former professional ice hockey goaltender.

Career 
Zimmerman won a Calder Cup as a member of the Rochester Americans in the 1967–1968 season and the Lester Patrick Cup as a member of the Vancouver Canucks during the 1969–1970 season. During the 1975–76 season, Zimmerman played eight games in the World Hockey Association (WHA) with the Denver Spurs/Ottawa Civics, and during the 1977–78 season he played another 20 WHA games with the Houston Aeros.

References

External links

1942 births
Living people
Baltimore Clippers players
Canadian ice hockey goaltenders
Charlotte Checkers (EHL) players
Denver Spurs players
Erie Blades players
Houston Aeros (WHA) players
Johnstown Jets players
Memphis South Stars players
Ottawa Civics players
Philadelphia Firebirds (AHL) players
Rochester Americans players
Vancouver Canucks (WHL) players
Ice hockey people from Ontario
Sportspeople from Fort Erie, Ontario
Canadian expatriate ice hockey players in the United States